The Psychiatric Rehabilitation Association (PRA) is a professional association for practitioners of psychiatric rehabilitation who serve persons and families living with psychiatric disorders.  Colleen Eubanks is Chief Executive Officer.

History
PRA was incorporated in 1974 as the International Association of Psychosocial Rehabilitation Services. It was founded by the directors of the original 13 psychosocial rehabilitation centers in the United States,  PRA promotes evidence-based recovery from mental illness practice and works with government agencies, universities and other institutions. In 2004, the name changed to United States Psychiatric Rehabilitation Association. In 2013, it removed the national designation from its name and became the Psychiatric Rehabilitation Association.

Publications
In 1982, PRA partnered with the Center for Psychiatric Rehabilitation at Boston University to publish the Psychiatric Rehabilitation Journal. The journal is now published quarterly in collaboration with the American Psychological Association. PRA also publishes two newsletters: Recovery Update (weekly) and PsyR Connections (quarterly).

Professional certification

The PRA issues the Certified Psychiatric Rehabilitation Practitioner, a professional certification designation recognized in 13 states in the U.S. as a qualification for mental health practitioners (with an additional 4 states pending): Arizona, Florida, Georgia, Hawaii, Idaho, Illinois, Iowa, Louisiana, Maine, Maryland, Minnesota, New York, New Jersey, Oklahoma, Pennsylvania and Virginia.

References

External links

Organizations established in 1974
Mental health organizations in Virginia
Non-profit organizations based in McLean, Virginia